The Blind Man of Seville is a 2003 crime novel and thriller by British writer Robert Wilson. The novel is set in the Spanish city of Seville, and is the first book in a quartet featuring protagonist Javier Falcón. The novel was published to much acclaim, and was shortlisted for the 2003 Gold Dagger for Best Crime Novel of the Year.

Plot summary
It is Holy Week in Seville – Semana Santa, the Easter week of passion and processions. A leading restaurateur is found bound, gagged and dead in front of his television set. The self-inflicted wounds tell of the man's struggle to avoid the unendurable images he has been forced to watch. When confronted by this horrific scene the normally cool and dispassionate homicide detective, Inspector Jefe Javier Falcón, is inexplicably afraid. He looks into the victim's ruined face and asks himself: 'What could be so terrible?' 
The investigation into the restaurateur's turbulent life sends Falcón trawling through his own past and the ferociously candid journals of his late father, a world-famous artist. Painful revelations churn up Falcón's unreliable memory and more killings push him to the edge of terrifying truth. And he realizes that this is not just the hunt for an all-seeing murderer who knows his victim's secret lives, but also the search for Falcón's own missing heart.

Television
The book was adapted in two parts for the Sky television series Falcón starring Marton Csokas in the title role. Produced by Mammoth Screen and broadcast on the 15 and 22 November 2012.

External links
Official Website of Robert Wilson's Novel
Review from BookRerporter.com
Interview with Wilson from ShotsMagazine
Bonus extracts from the diaries of Francisco Falcon, cut from original manuscript

2003 British novels
Novels by Robert Wilson
Novels set in Seville
Novels about artists
British detective novels
HarperCollins books